The WNBL Breakout Player of the Year (formerly the WNBL Youth Player of the Year Award) is an annual Women's National Basketball League (WNBL) award given since the 1988 WNBL season. The award is named the Betty Watson Breakout Player of the Year Award.

The award underwent a makeover for the 2019–20 season with new criteria seeing Australian players 23 years old or under eligible for Youth Player of the Year, replacing the long-standing Rookie of the Year. In 2022–23, the award was again redefined, to acknowledge any breakout player with an improved overall performance each season.

Winners

References 

Rookie
Rookie player awards